Aquatic therapy refers to treatments and exercises performed in water for relaxation, fitness, physical rehabilitation, and other therapeutic benefit.  Typically a qualified aquatic therapist gives constant attendance to a person receiving treatment in a heated therapy pool.  Aquatic therapy techniques include Ai Chi, Aqua Running, Bad Ragaz Ring Method, Burdenko Method, Halliwick, Watsu, and other aquatic bodywork forms. Therapeutic applications include neurological disorders, spine pain, musculoskeletal pain, postoperative orthopedic rehabilitation, pediatric disabilities, and pressure ulcers.

Overview 
Aquatic therapy refers to water-based treatments or exercises of therapeutic intent, in particular for relaxation, fitness, and physical rehabilitation.  Treatments and exercises are performed while floating, partially submerged, or fully submerged in water. Many aquatic therapy procedures require constant attendance by a trained therapist, and are performed in a specialized temperature-controlled pool. Rehabilitation commonly focuses on improving the physical function associated with illness, injury, or disability.

Aquatic therapy encompasses a broad set of approaches and techniques, including aquatic exercise, physical therapy, aquatic bodywork, and other movement-based therapy in water (hydrokinesiotherapy).  Treatment may be passive, involving a therapist or giver and a patient or receiver, or active, involving self-generated body positions, movement, or exercise.  Examples include Halliwick Aquatic Therapy, Bad Ragaz Ring Method, Watsu, and Ai chi.

For orthopedic rehabilitation, aquatic therapy is considered to be synonymous with therapeutic aquatic exercise, aqua therapy, aquatic rehabilitation, water therapy, and pool therapy. Aquatic therapy can support restoration of function for many areas of orthopedics, including sports medicine, work conditioning, joint arthroplasty, and back rehabilitation programs. A strong aquatic component is especially beneficial for therapy programs where limited or non-weight bearing is desirable and where normal functioning is limited by inflammation, pain, guarding, muscle spasm, and limited range of motion (ROM). Water provides a controllable environment for reeducation of weak muscles and skill development for neurological and neuromuscular impairment, acute orthopedic or neuromuscular injury, rheumatological disease, or recovery from recent surgery.

Various properties of water contribute to therapeutic effects, including the ability to use water for resistance in place of gravity or weights; thermal stability that permits maintenance of near-constant temperature; hydrostatic pressure that supports and stabilizes, and that influences heart and lung function; buoyancy that permits flotation and reduces the effects of gravity; and turbulence and wave propagation that allow gentle manipulation and movement.

History 
The use of water for therapeutic purposes first dates back to 2400 B.C. in the form of hydrotherapy, with records suggesting that ancient Egyptian, Assyrian, and Mohammedan cultures utilized mineral waters which were thought to have curative properties through the 18th century.

In 1911, Dr. Charles Leroy Lowman began to use therapeutic tubs to treat cerebral palsy and spastic patients in California at Orthopedic Hospital in Los Angeles. Lowman was inspired after a visit to Spaulding School for Crippled Children in Chicago, where wooden exercise tanks were used by paralyzed patients. The invention of the Hubbard Tank, developed by Leroy Hubbard, launched the evolution of modern aquatic therapy and the development of modern techniques including the Halliwick Concept and the Bad Ragaz Ring Method (BRRM). Throughout the 1930s, research and literature on aquatic exercise, pool treatment, and spa therapy began to appear in professional journals.  Dr. Charles Leroy Lowman's Technique of Underwater Gymnastics: A Study in Practical Application, published in 1937, introduced underwater exercises that were used to help restore muscle function lost by bodily deformities. The National Foundation for Infantile Paralysis began utilizing corrective swimming pools and Lowman's techniques for treatment of poliomyelitis in the 1950s.

The American Physical Therapy Association (APTA) recognized the aquatic therapy section within the APTA in 1992, after a vote within the House of Delegates of the APTA in Denver, CO after lobbying efforts spearheaded starting in 1989 by Judy Cirullo and Richard C. Ruoti.

Techniques 
Techniques for aquatic therapy include the following:

Ai Chi: Ai Chi, developed in 1993 by Jun Konno, uses diaphragmatic breathing and active progressive resistance training in water to relax and strengthen the body, based on elements of qigong and Tai chi chuan.
Aqua running: Aqua running (Deep Water Running or Aquajogging) is a form of cardiovascular conditioning, involving running or jogging in water, useful for injured athletes and those who desire a low-impact aerobic workout.  Aqua running is performed in deep water using a floatation device (vest or belt) to support the head above water.
Bad Ragaz Ring Method: The Bad Ragaz Ring Method (BRRM) focuses on rehabilitation of neuromuscular function using patterns of therapist-assisted exercise performed while the patient lies horizontal in water, with support provided by rings or floats around the neck, arms, pelvis, and knees. BRRM is an aquatic version of Proprioceptive Neuromuscular Facilitation (PNF) developed by physiotherapists at Bad Ragaz, Switzerland, as a synthesis of aquatic exercises designed by a German physician in the 1930s and land-based PNF developed by American physiotherapists in the 1950s and 1960s.
Burdenko Method: The Burdenko Method, originally developed by Soviet professor of sports medicine Igor Burdenko, is an integrated land-water therapy approach that develops balance, coordination, flexibility, endurance, speed, and strength using the same methods as professional athletes. The water-based therapy uses buoyant equipment to challenge the center of buoyancy in vertical positions, exercising with movement in multiple directions, and at multiple speeds ranging from slow to fast.
Halliwick Concept: The Halliwick Concept, originally developed by fluid mechanics engineer James McMillan in the late 1940s and 1950s at the Halliwick School for Girls with Disabilities in London, focuses on biophysical principles of motor control in water, in particular developing sense of balance (equilibrioception) and core stability. The Halliwick Ten-Point-Program implements the concept in a progressive program of mental adjustment, disengagement, and development of motor control, with an emphasis on rotational control, and applies the program to teach physically disabled people balance control, swimming, and independence.  Halliwick Aquatic Therapy (also known as Water Specific Therapy, WST), implements the concept in patient-specific aquatic therapy.
Watsu: Watsu is a form of aquatic bodywork, originally developed in the early 1980s by Harold Dull at Harbin Hot Springs, California, in which an aquatic therapist continuously supports and guides the person receiving treatment through a series of flowing movements and stretches that induce deep relaxation and provide therapeutic benefit. In the late 1980s and early 1990s physiotherapists began to use Watsu for a wide range of orthopedic and neurologic conditions, and to adapt the techniques for use with injury and disability.

Applications and effectiveness 
Applications of aquatic therapy include neurological disorders, spine pain, musculoskeletal pain, postoperative orthopedic rehabilitation, pediatric disabilities, and pressure ulcers.

A 2006 systematic review of effects of aquatic interventions in children with neuromotor impairments found "substantial lack of evidence-based research evaluating the specific effects of aquatic interventions in this population".

For musculoskeletal rehabilitation, aquatic therapy is typically used to treat acute injuries as well as subjective pain of chronic conditions, such as arthritis. Water immersion has compressive effects and reflexively regulates blood vessel tone. Muscle blood flow increases by about 225% during immersion, as increased cardiac output is distributed to skin and muscle tissue. Flotation is able to counteract the effects of gravitational force on joints, creating a low impact environment for joints to perform within. The temperature changes, increase in systolic blood pressure to extremities, and overall increase in ambulation are factors which help immersion to alleviate pain. Aquatic Therapy helps with pain and stiffness, but can also improve quality of life, tone the muscles in the body, and can help with movement in the knees and hips. Protocols using a combination of strengthening, flexibility, and balance exercises resulted in the greatest improvements in Childhood Health Assessment Questionnaire scores, whereas aerobic exercise did not result in greater improvements in CHAQ scores compared to a comparison group performing Qigong. Not only does aquatic therapy help with pain, but can benefit postural stability, meaning it can help to strengthen balance functions especially with people who have neurological disorders. For people diagnosed with Parkinson's disease, aquatic exercise has been proven to be more beneficial than land-based exercise for two important outcome measures. The Berg Balance Scale and Falls Efficacy Scale score were reported to have significant improvement when implementing aquatic exercise over land-based exercise. These results suggest that aquatic exercise can be extremely helpful for Parkinson's disease patients with specific balance disorders and fear of falling.

Aquatic therapy in warm water has been shown to have a positive effect on the aerobic capacity of people with fibromyalgia. It is still inconclusive whether land therapy is better than aquatic therapy however it has been demonstrated that aquatic therapy is as effective as land base therapy. There are advantageous outcomes for patients with fibromyalgia resulting from aquatic therapy such as decrease of articulate load regarding an individual's biomechanics.

Currently there is no standardized aquatic therapy protocol for people post stroke however it is safe to conclude that aquatic therapy can be more effective than land based therapy for improving balance and mobility. There is insufficient evidence regarding improvements in functional independence of people post stroke.

From a cardiopulmonary standpoint, aquatic therapy is often used because its effects mirror land-based effects but at lower speeds. During immersion, blood is displaced upwards into heart and there is an increase in pulse pressure due to increased cardiac filling. Cardiac volume increases 27-30%. Oxygen consumption is increased with exercise, and heart rate is increased at higher temperatures, and decreased at lower temperatures. However, immersion can worsen effects in cases of valvular insufficiency due to this cardiac and stroke volume increase. The aquatic environment is also not recommended for those who experience severe or uncontrolled heart failure.

Professional training and certification 

Aquatic therapy is performed by diverse professionals with specific training and certification requirements. An aquatic therapy specialization is an add-on certification for healthcare providers, mainly including physical therapists and athletic trainers.

For medical purposes, aquatic therapy, as defined by the American Medical Association (AMA), can be performed by various legally-regulated healthcare professionals who have scopes of practice that permit them to offer such services and who are permitted to use AMA Current Procedural Terminology (CPT) codes. Currently, aquatic therapy certification is provided by the Aquatic Therapy and Rehab Institute (ATRI), which aims to further education for therapists and healthcare professionals working in aquatic environments. The ATRI prerequisites for certification include 15 hours of Aquatic Therapy, Rehab and/or Aquatic Therapeutic Exercise education, which can be completed hands-on or online. Once completing the prerequisites, those pursuing certification can take the Aquatic Therapy & Rehab Institutes Aquatic Therapeutic Exercise Certification exam.

References 

 
Hydrotherapy
Manual therapy
Massage therapy
Physical therapy
Rehabilitation medicine